
Year 550 (DL) was a common year starting on Saturday (link will display the full calendar) of the Julian calendar. The denomination 550 for this year has been used since the early medieval period, when the Anno Domini calendar era became the prevalent method in Europe for naming years.

Events 
 By place 
 Byzantine Empire 
 Emperor Justinian I appoints Bessas commander (magister militum) of Armenia, and entrusts him with the war in Lazica (Georgia).
 Siege of Petra (550–551)
 January 16 – Gothic War: The Ostrogoths under king Totila recapture Rome after a long siege, by bribing the Isaurian garrison.
 Summer – Totila plunders Sicily, after he subdues Corsica and Sardinia. He sends a Gothic fleet to raid the coasts of Greece.
 Justinian I sends two Nestorian monks on a mission to Central Asia, to spread Christianity in the East (approximate date).

 Europe 
 The Vendel era begins; the name is given to a region in Uppland (an important area of the sagas' account of a Swedish kingdom).

 Persia 
 The Sassanid Empire, under the reign of King Khosrow I, controls the trade of silk destined for Europe and the Byzantine Empire.

 Asia 
 The Eastern Wei Dynasty ends, and Wen Xuan Di becomes emperor of Northern Qi. He forces Xiao Jing Di to yield the throne.
 Wen Xuan Di adopts a defensive policy towards the hostile northern tribes; he builds over 1,000 miles of walls on the border.
 The Gupta Empire falls; India is again ruled by regional kingdoms (approximate date).

 Americas 
 Construction of Quiriguá (Guatemala) begins (approximate date).
 The last known eruption of Chimborazo (modern Ecuador) occurs.

 By topic 
 Arts and sciences 
 Hindu mathematicians give zero a numeral representation in a positional notation system.
 Procopius writes the Secret History (approximate date).

 Religion 
 The churches of Lazica (Georgia) and Armenia split. While the Armenian Church remains independent, the Georgian church unites with the Byzantine Empire. This ecclesiastical union deepens political and cultural contact between the two states. As a sign of Lazica's status vis-à-vis Byzantium, Lazic princes are vested with honorific titles of the Byzantine court, including kouropalates, or "minister of the imperial palace" (approximate date).
 The main redaction of the Babylonian Talmud is completed under Rabbis Ravina and Ashi (approximate date).
 Chararic, king of the Suevi, converts to Catholicism.
 In Ireland, the Diocese of Tuam is erected.

Births 
probable
Pope Boniface IV (approximate date)
Finbarr of Cork, Irish bishop (approximate date)
Gallus, Irish missionary (approximate date)
Gaugericus, bishop of Cambrai (approximate date)
John Moschus, Byzantine monk (approximate date)
Peter III of Callinicum, Syriac Orthodox Patriarch of Antioch (approximate date)

Deaths 
 May 8 – Desideratus, French saint
exact date unknown
Aryabhata, Indian mathematician-astronomer (b. 476)
Buddhapālita, Indian Madhyamaka scholar (b. 470)
Drest V, king of the Picts 
Germanus, Byzantine general (magister militum)
probable
Dubricius, British bishop and saint 
Eustathius of Mtskheta, Orthodox Christian saint

References